American singer Selena released six studio albums, three live albums, three boxsets, one remix album, two soundtrack albums, and twenty compilation albums. Credited for elevating a music genre into the mainstream market, Selena remains the best-selling Tejano recording artist whose posthumous releases continue to outsell those of living musicians. Selena has sold 18 million units worldwide (12 millions according to Nielsen Soundscan), making her one of the best-selling artists in Latin music. She was named the top-selling Latin artist of the 1990s decade by Billboard magazine.

Selena's career began as lead vocalist of Los Dinos in 1980. Her albums with Los Dinos on the indie labels failed to gain any chart success. She signed with EMI Latin nine years later as a solo artist though her band continued to tour with her. She released her self-titled debut album that same year, which peaked at number seven on the U.S. Billboard Regional Mexican Albums chart. With Selena, the singer outsold other competing female Tejano artists. Her second album, Ven Conmigo, was released a year later and was billed as the first Tejano recording by a female musician to achieve gold status in the United States. In 1992, Selena released her "breakthrough album", Entre a Mi Mundo, which helped launch the singer's career in Mexico along with its single "Como la Flor". Entre a Mi Mundo became the first Tejano recording by a female artist to sell over 300,000 copies, and was the best-selling Regional Mexican Album of 1993, it also ranks second on the Regional Mexican Albums All-time chart.

In 1993, Selena released Live, which contained three studio tracks. Live won Selena a Grammy and peaked at number two on the newly formed U.S. Billboard Top Latin Albums chart and was certified gold by the Recording Industry Association of America (RIAA) for shipments of 500,000 copies. Selena released Amor Prohibido in March 1994; it was certified double Diamond by the RIAA, denoting shipments of two million copies in the United States. Additionally, the album spawned four consecutive US Latin number-one singles. By December 1994, Amor Prohibido became the second Tejano recording to achieve year-end sales of 500,000 copies. It was considered her "biggest album" and was credited with popularizing Tejano music among a younger and wider audience than any time in the genre's history. With Amor Prohibido, Selena was considered "bigger than Tejano itself", and broke barriers in the Latin music world. This prompted EMI to begin marketing Selena as an American pop artist, believing she had reached her peak in the Latin music market. The singer recorded four tracks slated for what would have been her English-language crossover album by March 1995. On March 31, 1995, Selena was shot dead by Yolanda Saldívar, her friend and a former employee of her Selena Etc. boutiques over disputed embezzlement claims.

EMI Records and EMI Latin jointly released Dreaming of You in July 1995. It sold 175,000 copies its first day of release, a then-record for a female vocalist. Dreaming of You debuted on top the Billboard 200 chart with 331,000 units sold its first week, the second largest first-week sales for a female musician. Dreaming of You became the first and to date the only predominantly Spanish-language album to debut and peak at number one on the Billboard 200 chart. Dreaming of You was among the top ten best-selling debuts for a musician, best-selling debut by a female act, and was the fastest-selling U.S. album in 1995. Dreaming of You went on to become the best-selling Latin and Latin pop album for two consecutive years. At the time, Dreaming of You helped Selena to become the fastest-selling female act in recorded music history, and has since been ranked among the best and most important recordings produced during the rock and roll era. With Dreaming of You peaking at number one, Tejano music entered the mainstream English market. As of January 2015, Dreaming of You has sold five million copies worldwide, and remains the best-selling Latin album of all-time in the United States. Since Selena's death, there have been twenty-three posthumous releases with the most recent, Lo Mejor de...Selena, released on the twentieth anniversary of her death.

Studio albums

Soundtrack albums

Live albums

Compilation albums

Remix albums

Box sets

See also 

List of best-selling Latin albums in the United States
List of songs recorded by Selena
Selena singles discography
Selena videography

Notes

References

Sources 

 - Read online, registration required

External links 
 
 
 

Discography
Discographies of American artists
Latin pop music discographies
Regional Mexican music discographies